Blu de Golyer (born July 9, 1975) is an American writer and filmmaker.  In 2013, Blu wrote and produced House of Good and Evil, starring Rachel Marie Lewis and German actor Christian Oliver.  In 2014, he wrote and produced the Hillbilly Horror Show.

Blu has also produced the film Noah's Ark. Blu de Golyer is also a published author with his series of children's books The Adventures Of Captain Greenspud.

Blu de Golyer is the great nephew of stage actress Mary de Golyer (The Red Menace 1949). He is also related to oil tycoon Everette Lee DeGolyer.

References

External links 
 

Filmography Writer:
Bullard
Devious
Finding Waldo
The Lycanthropist
Being With Infants And Toddlers
Hillbilly Horror Show
House Of Good And Evil

1975 births
Living people
American male writers
American filmmakers